Wang Zhiliang (19 June 1928 – 2 January 2023) was a Chinese-Australian literary translator who had been honored by the Government of the Russian Federation. Wang rendered a great number of Russian literary works into Chinese for almost five decades, including 30 novels.

Wang was one of the main translators of the works of the Russian novelists Ivan Turgenev and Alexander Pushkin into Chinese. For his contributions to the introduction of Russian literature to foreign readers, he was honored with a Pushkin Medal by the Government of the Russian Federation in 1999.

Life and career
Wang was born on 19 June 1928 in Hanzhong, Shaanxi, with his ancestral home in Jiangning County, Jiangsu.

Wang entered Peking University in 1947, majoring in Russian language, he studied literature under Hu Shih and Zhu Guangqian, and he taught there when graduated in 1952. He was transferred to the Chinese Academy of Sciences in 1954.

In 1958, Wang was labeled as a rightist by the Chinese government. Subsequently, he was sent to the May Seventh Cadre Schools to work in Taihang Mountains. In 1960, Wang worked in Shanghai as a factory worker.

After the Cultural Revolution, Wang taught at East China Normal University from 1977. In the 1990s, Wang emigrated to Australia with his children. He settled in Shanghai in the 2000s.

Wang died on 2 January 2023, at the age of 94.

Translations
 Eugene Onegin (Alexander Pushkin)
 The Captain's Daughter (Alexander Pushkin)
 Anna Karenina (Leo Tolstoy)
 Home of the Gentry (Ivan Turgenev)
 On the Eve (Ivan Turgenev)
 Poetry of Turgenev (Ivan Turgenev)
 Poetry of Lermontov (Mikhail Lermontov)

Works
 A Poor Mountain Village
 Russian Literature in the 19th Century
 Essays of Zhiliang
 Traditions and Memories
 Renhaipiaofusanji
 The City: Melbourne

Awards
 In 1999, he was awarded a Pushkin Medal for his translations by the Government of the Russian Federation.

References

1928 births
2023 deaths
Writers from Hanzhong
Peking University alumni
Australian translators
Russian–Chinese translators
Australian people of Chinese descent
People's Republic of China translators
Academic staff of the East China Normal University
Educators from Shaanxi
20th-century Chinese translators
21st-century Chinese translators
Literary translators
People of the Republic of China